Ahn Sol-bin (born August 19, 1997), known mononymously as Solbin,  is a South Korean singer and actress. She is a member of the girl group Laboum.

Discography

Filmography

Film

Television series

Web series

Television shows

Web shows

Awards and nominations

References

External links 
 
 

1997 births
Living people
People from Seongnam
21st-century South Korean actresses
South Korean female models
South Korean television actresses
South Korean film actresses
South Korean female idols